Maffeo is a given name and a surname. Notable people with the name include:

Given name
Maffeo Barberini (1568–1644), reigned as Pope Urban VIII from 1623 to his death in 1644
Maffeo Barberini (1631–1685), Italian nobleman of the Barberini, Prince of Palestrina
Maffeo Giovanni Ducoli (1918–2012), Italian Prelate of the Roman Catholic Church
Maffeo Gherardi (1406–1492), called the Cardinal of Venice, Italian Roman Catholic bishop and cardinal
Maffeo Pantaleoni (1857–1924), Italian economist
Maffeo Polo (1230–1309), Italian travelling merchant and uncle of the explorer Marco Polo
Maffeo Vegio (1407–1458), Italian poet who wrote in Latin
Maffeo Verona (1576–1618), Italian painter of the late-Renaissance
Maffeo Vitale (died 1669), Roman Catholic prelate who served as Bishop of Mantova (1646–1669)

Surname
Jerome Maffeo, drummer in Jimmie's Chicken Shack, an American alternative rock band from Annapolis, Maryland
Lois Maffeo, American musician and writer
Pablo Maffeo (born 1997), Spanish professional footballer
Víctor Maffeo (born 2000), Spanish professional footballer

See also
Portrait of Maffeo Barberini (c. 1598) by Michelangelo Merisi da Caravaggio

Surnames of Italian origin